Lethrinus olivaceus, common name longface emperor or long-nosed emperor,  is a species of bony fishes belonging to the family Lethrinidae.

Description

This large lethrinid has a very long snout, with dark wavy streaks. The basic color of the body is olive-grayish, usually with various irregular darker blotches, but it can have different colour and pattern for a better camouflage. It has 10 dorsal spine, 9 dorsal soft rays, 3 anal spines and 8 anal soft rays. Juveniles show a more forked caudal fin. This species is very similar to Lethrinus microdon.

Distribution
This species is widespread in Indo-West Pacific, from Red Sea and East Africa to Samoa and Ryukyu Islands.

Habitat
It is a reef-associated species and it can be found in lagoons, in sandy coastal areas and in reef slopes, at depths of 1 to 185 m.

Biology
These very active and fast swimming fishes often occur in large schools, but adults are usually  solitary. They are occasionally found in small schools with Lethrinus microdon. They feed mainly on crustaceans, cephalopods and fishes.

References

External links
 
 NCBI
 Animal Diversity
 

Lethrinidae
Fish described in 1830